is a Japanese singer, actress, tarento, and politician. She joined the Japanese pop idol group Onyanko Club in 1986.

Biography
She was born in Setagaya, Tokyo, but moved to Koganei when she was a little girl. She has an elder sister and an elder brother. She was considered an honor student in elementary school. Additionally, she was a member of a local soccer club. She was nicknamed  because of her round face. At the time, she was courted by many boys.

This, however, led her to join an entertainment agency affiliated with Horipro, and she became active as a model. In 1986, it was decided that the popular manga Touch would be made into a movie, and she auditioned for the role of the heroine of the movie. She was told in advance by the audition officials that you would be selected, nevertheless, she was subsequently rejected in the final round because of her affiliation with an entertainment agency. She cried at this treatment and developed an intense distrust of the entertainment industry.

However, in June 1986, she auditioned for a variety show called  featuring the then very popular idol group Onyanko Club, and she was accepted. In November 1986, Onyanko Club released a song called Koi wa Question, and she was selected as one of the lead vocalists for the first time. This song is considered one of Onyanko Club's most accomplished works. In December 1986, comedian  got into trouble when he pressed his crotch against her face during Yūyake Nyan Nyan.

In February 1987, she took the entrance exams for Rikkyo University, Seikei University, and Otsuma Women's University, in addition to the prestigious Waseda University where her elder brother was enrolled, but was not accepted, partly because her entertainment activities did not allow her enough time to study. In April 1987, she had no choice but to attend English literature department at Keisen Women's Junior College. However, She was selected, along with Shizuka Kudō and Makiko Saitō, to be a member of the sub-group Ushirogami Hikaretai , replacing Ushiroyubi Sasaregumi, which was disbanded after the graduation of Mamiko Takai. At the time of its formation, she was considered the main figure. In addition, she became a DJ on a radio show called , along with popular member Marina Watanabe. In May 1987, their debut song, was released. This song was the theme song for the anime High School! Kimengumi and ranked number one on the Oricon charts. In July 1987, they hosted a radio show, along with TV personality Tsutomu Sekine. She also became a topic of conversation when she appeared in Lawson's Karaage commercial. Although Onyanko Club disbanded in September 1987, Ushirogami Hikaretai continued its activities, and they held concerts, but their activities were suspended in May 1988. Shortly thereafter, she made her solo debut with the song , the theme song of the anime Tsuide ni Tonchinkan.

Since then, she has been active in TV dramas and variety shows in addition to singing. From 1999 to 2003, she played the role of a mother who used to be a yankee(the term "yankee" here means "delinquent girl") in a well-received drama series called . She also appeared in a popular Jidaigeki called The Unfettered Shogun.

Personal life 
In 2003, she married , a producer for a commercial production company. They then opened a teppanyaki restaurant. In 2006, She gave birth to a baby girl.

Cancer Battle 
In November 2015, Ikuina announced that she had received treatment for breast cancer. She was first diagnosed in April 2011 on her 43rd birthday, and had undergone five different surgical procedures in the time between her diagnosis and her announcement, the most recent of which had resulted in a total mastectomy of her right breast.

In 2016, she released a book entitled "To my Right Breast: Thank You and Farewell" (右胸にありがとう そしてさようなら) documenting the four-year, eight-month long battle from her diagnosis to her fifth surgery.

Political career 

On April 4, 2022, Ikuina announced her bid for parliament under the Liberal Democratic Party. 2 days later she stated "I'd like to not dirty the Onyanko Club name and do my best." Her opposition to same-sex marriage on an NHK questionnaire attracted controversy, with 14 out of 26 questions left unanswered. It was later revealed that Ikuina's response on a question about Coronavirus policy was identical to LDP opponent Kentaro Asahi's, only changed to be grammatically feminine.

In July 2022, she was elected fifth in the six-member House of Councillors' Tokyo constituency.

Discography

Singles

Special singles 
  (1989)

Albums

Studio albums 
  (1988)
  (1989)

Compilation albums 
  series
  (2002)
  (2008)
  (2010)
  (2007)

Films
 Gatsby Bokura wa Kono Natsu Necktie o Suru (1990)
 Okuman Chōja ni Natta Otoko (1994), Kazumi Kasai
 Te no Hira no Shiawase (2010), Ikuko Takebayashi
 Live (2014), Yōko Tamura

TV programs
 1996-2003: Abarenbō Shōgun, as Obun, (6-12 and the special in 2003) 
 1999-2003: Kids War: Zaken na yo

References

External links
  
 

Onyanko Club
Living people
Japanese entertainers
Japanese idols
Japanese actresses
Japanese women pop singers
1968 births
Singers from Tokyo
Liberal Democratic Party (Japan) politicians
Female members of the House of Councillors (Japan)
Members of the House of Councillors (Japan)
Japanese actor-politicians
Politicians from Tokyo